is a Quasi-National Park in Nara and Wakayama Prefectures, Japan. It was established in 1967.

Places of interest
 Kōya-san
 , connected with the legend of Anchin and Kiyohime

Related municipalities
 Nara: Nosegawa, Totsukawa
 Wakayama: Aridagawa, Katsuragi, Kōya, Tanabe

See also
 List of national parks of Japan
 Sacred Sites and Pilgrimage Routes in the Kii Mountain Range
 Kōyasan chōishi-michi

References

External links

  Map of parks in Nara Prefecture
  Map of parks in Wakayama Prefecture

National parks of Japan
Parks and gardens in Nara Prefecture
Parks and gardens in Wakayama Prefecture
Protected areas established in 1967
1967 establishments in Japan